Federal elections were held in Germany on 27 September 1998 to elect the members of the 14th Bundestag. The Social Democratic Party (SPD) emerged as the largest faction in parliament for the first time since 1972, with its leader Gerhard Schröder becoming chancellor. The Christian Democrats had their worst election result since 1949.

Issues and campaign 
Since German reunification on 3 October 1990, the unemployment rate in Germany had risen from 4.2% to 9.4% in 1998, with the Federal Labor Office registering more than 4 million unemployed.  The unified Germany had to fight economic and domestic difficulties even as it actively participated in the project of European integration.  Most people blamed the centre-right coalition government of the Christian Democratic Union/Christian Social Union (CDU/CSU) and the Free Democratic Party (FDP) for the economic difficulties. Longtime Chancellor Helmut Kohl's government was regarded by many as not having fully implemented the unification after eight years, in view of the mass protests in many eastern German towns due to job losses and social welfare cuts.

The 1998 campaign began with both the CDU and SPD questioning who would lead their parties.  There had been rumours that Kohl would resign and allow Wolfgang Schäuble to take the reins of the CDU, but these rumours were rendered obsolete when Kohl announced in April 1997 that he would seek the chancellorship for a sixth term. The two contenders for the SPD nomination were Oskar Lafontaine, the party's chairman, and Gerhard Schröder, Minister-President of Lower Saxony.

On 1 March 1998, Schröder led the SPD to a huge victory in the Lower Saxony state election, gaining an unusual absolute majority for the second time and effectively receiving the SPD nomination for federal chancellor.  Schröder had announced he would withdraw his bid for the nomination if he received below 42 percent of the popular vote.  In the 1998 general elections, Schröder received 47.9 percent. Following this election, Lafontaine withdrew his bid and Schröder was inaugurated in the May 1998 convention. For the SPD, Schröder offered a new face for the party. He gave the party a new vigor, one that was lacking in the CDU after Kohl proclaimed his nomination. Many in the CDU questioned if Kohl had made the right choice for the party.

The CDU campaign was based on the experience and reputation of Kohl. One of the CDU's main slogans was 'Safety, not Risks.' "Kohl exploited his familiarity and experience, as well as his status as Europe's longest serving head of government." The SPD on the other hand ran the campaign using strategies developed in the United States and the United Kingdom.  The SPD set up election headquarters and introduced 'rapid rebuttal units' not unlike those used by Bill Clinton of the United States in his successful presidential bid in 1992.  The SPD avoided direct attacks at Kohl, but rather focused on their message of a "new center".

The FDP had usually ridden on the coattails of the CDU, and was mostly disapproved in the polls.  With the SPD well ahead in the polls, many of the voters from the CDU had fewer incentives to vote for the FDP.  The FDP was also having trouble projecting a coherent platform to voters.  The Greens too were having issues concerning their platform.

The two factions in the Greens, the fundamentalists and the pragmatists, had problems settling on their platform since the founding of the Green party.

The major issue of the 1998 campaign was unemployment.  In 1996, the unemployment rate in Germany surpassed the government's "limit" of 4 million unemployed people.  Both parties blamed high labor costs, high taxes and the high welfare costs as the causes of the problem.  During the campaign, Schröder used this issue against Kohl, calling him 'the unemployment chancellor.'  Unemployment was worst in the former East Germany.  While the national rate stood at 9.4 percent, former East Germany was suffering with unemployment at 20 percent. Many in the former East Germany blamed Kohl for the slow economic recovery.

Another issue at hand were Germany's tax and welfare reforms. While the CDU/CSU had offered proposals to reduce benefits in healthcare and pensions, the SPD controlled Bundesrat secured the passage of the bill. The proposed bill also offered tax cuts that were to benefit the rich, something the SPD opposed.  While Kohl continually pushed the issue of European integration, the issue fell short from voters' minds.  Schröder, on the other hand, almost ignored the issue. Many voters in Germany had other concerns besides the European Union.

Results

Results by state
Second vote (Zweitstimme, or votes for party list)

Constituency seats

List seats

Post-election

Results

Toward the end of the campaign, polls placed the CDU/CSU and FDP coalition in a tie with the SPD and Green coalition.  Despite these polls, the final numbers told a different story.  The SPD-Green coalition won an unexpectedly large victory, taking 345 seats and earning a strong majority in the Bundestag—the first centre-left absolute majority in post-World War II Germany.  The SPD won 40.9 percent of the vote, due to an increase of 4.5 percent from 1994.

The CDU/CSU-FDP coalition had gone into the election with a solid majority and 341 seats, but was cut down to 288 seats.  The CDU/CSU lost 6.2% of its 1994 vote, and lost 109 electoral districts to the SPD.  Germany's mixed-member proportional system, in which a slate of statewide delegates are elected alongside the electorate delegates, softened the blow somewhat, so the CDU/CSU only suffered a net loss of 49 seats.  It was still the CDU/CSU's worst defeat ever.  By contrast, their junior coalition partner, the FDP, netted a loss of just 4 seats.

The SPD swept all single-member constituency seats in the states of Brandenburg, Saxony-Anhalt, Saarland, Bremen, Hamburg and (for the first and last time) Schleswig-Holstein. Kohl lost his own constituency of Ludwigshafen, though he was still re-elected to the Bundestag through the Rhineland-Palatinate CDU party list, and he had not won the seat in the 1983 and 1987 elections. Future Chancellor Angela Merkel only narrowly won her constituency of Stralsund – Rügen – Grimmen with only 37.3 percent of the vote; the only time she got less than 40 percent of the vote.

A new government was formed by a coalition between the SPD and the Greens, with the SPD's Gerhard Schröder as chancellor and Greens leader Joschka Fischer as vice-chancellor and foreign minister.  It was the first red-green coalition government at the federal level in Germany, as well as the first purely centre-left government in post-World War II Germany.

Kohl stepped down as chairman of the CDU, as did CSU chairman Theodor Waigel.

Legacy

The 1998 German election was historic in many ways.  It resulted in a centre-right government being succeeded by a left-wing one—the first in postwar Germany (the SPD's previous term in government had been at the helm of a centre-left coalition).

In addition, it brought to an end the sixteen-year rule of Kohl – the second-longest of any German chancellor, and the longest tenure for a democratically elected head of government in German history.  It has been compared to the defeat of Winston Churchill in 1945 – both were seen as conservative wartime leaders, and in both cases both were turned out of office by the electorate once the war was over. Churchill was ousted before World War II was even over, while Kohl managed to hang onto power for two more terms after the reunification of Germany (which is often considered to be the end of the Cold War).

Literature

References

 "Social Democrats win German elections." Europe Oct. 1998 LexisNexis Academic. Leslie F. Maplass Library, Macomb, IL.
 The Federal Returning Officer

Federal elections in Germany
1998 elections in Germany
September 1998 events in Europe